Edward Colin James Hendry (born 7 December 1965) is a Scottish football coach and former professional footballer.

Hendry, who played as a defender notably played in the Premier League for Blackburn Rovers where he was part of the title winning side of 1995. He also played top flight football in both England and Scotland for Dundee, Manchester City, Rangers and Bolton Wanderers as well as stints in the Football League with Coventry City and Blackpool. He earned 51 caps for Scotland, scoring three times and was part of the Tartan Army's Euro 96 and World Cup 98 squads.

Following on from retirement, Hendry took over as  Blackpool manager and later had a spell in charge of Clyde. He later returned to Blackburn as part of their coaching staff having previously had a spell as assistant manager of Boston United.

Club career
Hendry first played for his local semi-professional club, Highland League outfit Keith, and Islavale, a North Scottish Junior club. He began his full-time professional career in 1983 with Dundee. During his early career, Hendry played mainly as a striker. In 1987 he was transferred to Blackburn Rovers, where he was converted into a defender. One of his first appearances came in the Full Members Cup final, where he scored the only goal in the 1–0 Wembley win over Charlton Athletic.

He played over 100 games for Blackburn before joining Manchester City in 1989, where he was named Player of the Year in the 1989–90 season. His days at City were numbered, however, after he fell out of manager Peter Reid's plans when Reid took over in November 1990 on the departure of Howard Kendall to Everton.

He was re-signed for Blackburn by Kenny Dalglish in November 1991 for a fee of £700,000 and helped them to great success including promotion from the Second Division and winning the FA Premier League. In 1998, he got a move back to Scotland to play with Rangers where he was signed by manager Dick Advocaat for £4 million. However, despite winning the domestic treble in his first season, his time there was relatively unhappy with Advocaat claiming that Hendry was "not his type of player". After his spell at Rangers, Hendry also played for Coventry City and Bolton Wanderers, as well as Preston North End and Blackpool on loan, before retiring from playing football.

Overall, Hendry played more than 500 league games and scored more than 40 goals in a playing career spanning 20 years.

In November 2018, Hendry played a league game for Blackburn Sunday League side Moorgate F.C.

International career

Hendry managed to win 51 caps for Scotland despite the fact that he was a latecomer to the international scene, not making his debut until he was 27. He captained Scotland in the 1998 World Cup. His last Scotland appearance, on 28 March 2001, saw Hendry score two goals in a 4–0 win over San Marino. His international career was ended as he was subsequently banned for six matches for elbowing San Marino substitute Nicola Albani later in that game.

Coaching career 

Hendry landed his first managerial job in June 2004 when he was appointed manager of his former club Blackpool, but was dismissed by the club in November 2005 following a poor run of results.

In September 2006 Hendry joined Boston United as assistant manager, and in June 2007 he became manager of Scottish side Clyde. Hendry lost his first three games in charge. He picked up his first victory in a Scottish Challenge Cup tie against fellow Scottish First Division side Queen of the South in August 2007. His best run was a six-game undefeated streak from November 2007 to December 2007. His final game in charge of Clyde was a Scottish Cup fourth-round match, which Clyde lost 1–0 to Dundee United. Hendry resigned as manager of Clyde on 18 January 2008,

In June 2012, Hendry re-joined Blackburn Rovers, initially as first team coach. He later became assistant manager of the club's under-21 team.

On 12 June 2014, Hendry left Rovers.

Personal life 

Hendry's wife, Denise, died on 10 July 2009, aged 43. Her death was caused by complications during an operation that was needed following cosmetic surgery performed in April 2002. Hendry has four children by his wife: Rheagan, Kyle, Callum and Niamh. His son Callum is also a footballer.

On 23 June 2010, Hendry was formally declared bankrupt at Blackpool County Court. It was reported that he faced a tax bill of more than £1m and owed thousands of pounds to other creditors. One of the creditors was SpreadEx, a betting company.

Hendry was charged with harassing and assaulting an ex-girlfriend in May 2015. He subsequently pleaded guilty to a charge of harassment, while the assault charge was dropped.

Career statistics

Club

International

Scores and results list Scotland's goal tally first, score column indicates score after each Hendry goal.

Honours
Blackburn Rovers
Premier League: 1994–95
Full Members' Cup: 1986–87

Rangers
Scottish Premier League: 1998–99
Scottish Cup: 1998–99
Scottish League Cup: 1998–99

Individual
PFA Team of the Year: 1988–89 Second Division, 1994–95 Premier League, 1997–98 Premier League
Scottish FA International Roll of Honour: 2001

See also
List of Scotland national football team captains

References

External links

1965 births
1998 FIFA World Cup players
Association football central defenders
Blackburn Rovers F.C. non-playing staff
Blackburn Rovers F.C. players
Blackpool F.C. managers
Blackpool F.C. players
Bolton Wanderers F.C. players
Boston United F.C. non-playing staff
Clyde F.C. managers
Coventry City F.C. players
Dundee F.C. players
Keith F.C. players
Islavale F.C. players
Living people
Manchester City F.C. players
People from Keith, Moray
Premier League players
Preston North End F.C. players
Rangers F.C. players
Scotland B international footballers
Scotland international footballers
Scottish Football League managers
Scottish Football League players
Scottish football managers
Scottish footballers
Scottish Premier League players
English Football League players
UEFA Euro 1996 players
Scottish Junior Football Association players
Sportspeople from Moray
Association football coaches